Woschitz is a surname. Notable people with the surname include:

 Karl Matthäus Woschitz (born 1937), Austrian theologian and bible scholar
 Thomas Woschitz (born 1968), Austrian film director, screenwriter, and film editor